Communauté d'agglomération de Saintes is the communauté d'agglomération, an intercommunal structure, centred on the town of Rochefort. It is located in the Charente-Maritime department, in the Nouvelle-Aquitaine region, southwestern France. Created in 2014, its seat is in Rochefort. Its area is 421.4 km2. Its population was 63,480 in 2019, of which 23,584 in Rochefort proper.

Composition
The communauté d'agglomération consists of the following 25 communes:

Beaugeay
Breuil-Magné
Cabariot
Champagne
Échillais
Fouras
La Gripperie-Saint-Symphorien
Île-d'Aix
Loire-les-Marais
Lussant
Moëze
Moragne
Muron
Port-des-Barques
Rochefort
Saint-Agnant
Saint-Coutant-le-Grand
Saint-Froult
Saint-Hippolyte
Saint-Jean-d'Angle
Saint-Laurent-de-la-Prée
Saint-Nazaire-sur-Charente
Soubise
Tonnay-Charente
Vergeroux

References

Rochefort
Rochefort